The 2021 Halton Borough Council election took place on 6 May 2021 to elect all 54 members (reduced from 56 at the last elections) of the council due to a redrawing of boundaries. It was held on the same day as other local elections. Turnout was 25%.

Results

Council composition
Following the last election in 2019, the composition of the council was:

After the election, the composition of the council was:

LD - Liberal Democrats 
C - Conservative 
G - Green Party

Ward results

Appleton

Bankfield

Beechwood & Heath

Birchfield

Bridgewater

Central & West Bank

Daresbury, Moore & Sandymoor

Ditton, Hale Village & Halebank

Farnworth

Grange

Halton Castle

Halton Lea

Halton View

Highfield

Hough Green

Mersey & Weston

Norton North

Norton South & Preston Brook

By-elections

Halton Castle

References

Halton
May 2021 events in the United Kingdom
2021
2020s in Cheshire